Uni-President Enterprises Corporation is an international food conglomerate based in Tainan, Taiwan. It is the largest food production company in Taiwan as well as Asia, and has a significant market share in dairy products, foods and snacks, and beverages. It is also responsible for running Starbucks, 7-Eleven, Mister Donut and Carrefour in Taiwan. In addition, Uni-President has subsidiaries in Mainland China,Vietnam, Thailand and the Philippines.

Furthermore, Uni-President is the owner of Uni-President Lions, a professional baseball team in Taiwan's Chinese Professional Baseball League.

History 
In 1967, the “Uni-President Enterprise Co.” was opened in Syuejia, Tainan County. It started with the production of flour and feed. The chairman was Wu Xiuqi, and the general manager was Kao Ching-yuen.

In 1969, Uni-President began preparations for the production of instant noodles and cooperated with Nissin Milling Technology to that end, and subsequently invested and set up factories in Thailand and established dealers in Hong Kong.

Related events

Food safety incidents

In 2001, the United Kingdom Food Standards Agency (FSA) found in tests of various sauces, including soy sauces, that 22% of samples contained the carcinogen 3-MCPD as well as its derivative 1,3-DCP at levels considerably higher than those deemed safe by the European Union.

Food Standards Australia New Zealand (FSANZ, formerly ANZFA) followed FSA research and took actions. "President Creamy Soy Sauce" from Taiwan was put on the ban list in the second round of testing.

See also 
 List of companies of Taiwan
 Uni-President China
 Dream Mall
 Science Noodles
 T & T Supermarket - Canadian former joint venture between Uni-President and 99 Ranch Market of the United States, now owned by Loblaw Companies.
 Books.com.tw

References 

Companies based in Tainan
1967 establishments in Taiwan
Companies of Taiwan
Food and drink companies established in 1967
Food and drink companies of Taiwan
Taiwanese brands